Vrata is a small settlement in the Municipality of Šmartno pri Litiji in central Slovenia. It lies in the hills south of Bogenšperk. The area is part of the historical region of Lower Carniola. The municipality is now included in the Central Slovenia Statistical Region.

References

External links
Vrata at Geopedia

Populated places in the Municipality of Šmartno pri Litiji